1900 Avenue of the Stars is a high-rise office building located in Century City, Los Angeles, California.

Location
The building is located at 1900 on the Avenue of the Stars in Century City in West Los Angeles.

History
It was designed by renowned architect Albert C. Martin, Jr. (1913–2006). Construction began in 1969 and was completed a year later, in 1970. It is 121.31 metres high, with twenty-seven floors. It is made of aluminum and tinted glass.

References

 

Century City, Los Angeles
Skyscraper office buildings in Los Angeles

Office buildings completed in 1970